Lieutenant-General Bakhtiar Rana  (b. 3 November 1910–1999) was a senior officer of the Pakistan Army who was notable for commanding the 1 Corps, during the Indo-Pakistani War of 1965.

Biography 
Rana was born in Hoshiarpur, Punjab in British India on 3 November 1910 into a Panjabi Muslim Rajput family that belonged to the Naroo clan of the Rajput tribe. His father, Rana Talia, was an officer in the British Indian Army who was later appointed as the first Muslim Inspector-General of the Punjab Police based in Patiala State. Rana Talia was later appointed to the North-West Frontier Province and briefly served in the Frontier Constabulary where he was deployed in Kohat, Hangu, and areas adjacent to Afghanistan.

After his matriculation, Bakhtiar went to attend the famed Aligarh Muslim University (AMU) and later made a transfer to attend the Forman Christian College University in Lahore. In 1931, Bakthiar left his university studies when he was accepted to join the Indian Military Academy in Dehradun, and passed out from the academy in 1936.

Military career 
In 1936, he was commissioned in the 1st Piffers in the Frontier Force Regiment as a 2nd-Lt. In 1939, Lt. Bakhtiar participated in World War II, first serving in India's frontier operations before being dispatched to the Mediterranean and Middle East Front, and later fighting in North Africa and Italy. For the time being, Maj. Bakhtiar served as an acting commanding officer of the 6/13th FF Rifles. His valorous actions earned him the Military Cross from Great Britain in 1945–1946. In August 1947, Maj. Bakhtiar held the command of the 2nd Garhwal Rifles before being posted in western India.

After the partition of India, Lt-Col. Bakhtiar decided to transfer to the Pakistan Army, and his 1st Piffers Btn was known for having more locals than any other regiment in the country at that time. In 1953, Brig. Bakhtiar Rana was appointed to command the Frontier Corps in Khyber-Pakhtunkhwa as its Inspector-General until 1955.

He was Chief Martial Law Administrator (West Pakistan). As a Lieutenant General, he commanded one of Pakistan Army's strike corps, I Corps, as its Corps Commander from 1958 to 1966. As a Brigadier, he commanded the Frontier Corps in Khyber Pakhtunkhwa as its Inspector-General from 1953 to 1955. His younger son, Major-General Ghaziuddin Rana, also went on to command the Frontier Corps from 1988 to 1990. To this day, they are the only father and son duo to have commanded the Frontier Corps during their separate military careers.

As a Lieutenant General, he commanded one of Pakistan Army's strike corps, I Corps, as its Corps Commander from 1958 to 1966. During the Indo-Pakistani War of 1965, Lt. Gen. Bakhtiar Rana was the only lieutenant general commanding a corps, namely 1 Corps, and he was one of only two lieutenant generals in the Pakistan Army during the war, the other being Lt. Gen. Altaf Qadir, who was on deputation to the Central Treaty Organization (CENTO).

Family 
Rana had two sons and one daughter. Both his sons, Ghaziuddin Rana and Salahuddin Rana, joined the Pakistan Army and rose to the ranks of Major General and Brigadier respectively. His younger son, Maj. Gen. Ghazi-ud-din Rana, also served as his Aide-de-camp. Lt. Gen. Bakhtiar Rana's sister, Begum Akhtar Sultan, was married to Amir Habibullah Khan Saadi and his daughter, Talat, was married to the grandson of Chaudhry Niaz Ali Khan.

Death
Rana died in Lahore, Pakistan, in 4:30 pm 10 February 1998.

Awards and decorations

Foreign decorations

References

External links 
 http://www.khyber.org/pashtohistory/frontiercorps/frontiercorps.shtml
 http://afpakwar.com/blog/archives/4667
 http://www.understandingpakistan.com/index.php/pakistan-india-war-of-1965-the-ground-war-athar-osama

1910 births
1999 deaths
Punjabi people
People from Hoshiarpur
Aligarh Muslim University alumni
Forman Christian College alumni
Indian Military Academy alumni
British Indian Army soldiers
British Indian Army officers
Pakistani generals
Military personnel from Lahore
Generals of the Indo-Pakistani War of 1965